Alpha Squadron is a fictional team of mutants appearing in American comic books published by Marvel Comics. The characters were featured in the comic book series New X-Men: Academy X, in the Marvel Universe. They are students of the Xavier Institute and are instructed by members of the X-Men. The squad’s colors are red, grey and black.

After M-Day, all individual teams of the Xavier Institute disbanded and have been formed into one group.

Advisors 

Alpha Squadron was advised by former Alpha Flight member, Northstar. Thus the name Alpha Squadron. When Northstar was seemingly killed by Wolverine, the squad was assigned a new advisor, Karma.

Members 
The members of the Alpha Squadron were:
 Anole (Victor Borkowski) – Victor was the leader of Alpha Squadron and he is openly gay. He possesses a reptilian mutation that grants him a spiked head carapace, an elastic tongue, wall-crawling and adaptive camouflage; in addition, Victor possesses regenerative capabilities and enhanced physical skills. Anole was one of the 27 students at the Xavier Institute to retain his powers after M-Day. He is currently a student at the Xavier Institute for Mutant Education and Outreach.
 Rubbermaid (Andrea Margulies) – Andrea possessed an elastic and malleable body that allowed her to stretch any part of her anatomy to great lengths and absorb physical damage without injury. She was the youngest member of Alpha Squadron. Rubbermaid lost her powers after M-Day and she died on a bus that was attacked by Stryker in New X-Men #23.
 Indra (Paras Gavaskar) – Paras is from India. He has a younger sister who was also a student at the Xavier Institute; she has yet to be introduced. The name Indra is taken from the Hindu god of weather and war, and he is endowed with the ability to form protective armour around his body which shields him from physical harm. Indra was one of the 27 students at the Xavier Institute to retain his powers after M-Day. He is currently a student at the Xavier Institute for Mutant Education and Outreach.
 Loa (Alani Ryan) – Alani is Hawaiian. She possesses the ability to pass through solid material and disintegrate it. Loa was one of the 27 students at the Xavier Institute to retain her powers after M-Day. She is currently a student at the Xavier Institute for Mutant Education and Outreach.
 Network (Sarah Vale) – Sarah possessed the ability to communicate with and manipulate machinery. This allowed to access computer files and manipulate programming to suit her needs among other things. Network was depowered after M-Day and she died on a bus that was attacked by Stryker in New X-Men #23. She is Preview's sister.
 Kidogo (Lazaro Kotikash) – Lazaro is a Maasai and almost a head taller than anyone else on his team. He possessed the ability to shrink his entire body down to a height of four inches by displacing his mass extra dimensionally. In the New X-Men: Yearbook Special #1, he was voted Most Ironic Power. Kidogo was depowered after M-Day; however, he wasn't on the bus that got bombed by Stryker.

Decimation
After House of M, Wanda Maximoff depowered 90% of the mutant population. The Xavier Institute was affected a great deal, losing many of the students and some X-Men. Alpha Squadron was also affected. Rubbermaid, Network and Kidogo lost their powers while Anole, Indra and Loa kept theirs. Karma also kept hers. Rubbermaid and Network unfortunately died in the bus attack from William Stryker. Kidogo's status and whereabouts are unknown.

Squad sexuality
 Nunzio DeFilippis and Christina Weir have stated that it is not impossible that Alpha Squadron has more gay members (2 or 3) than other squads. As they have only made a decision on Anole's sexuality, they aren't sure about this yet.  It remains to be seen if this idea will still be in effect after Decimation and the change of writers.
 Shan Coy Manh and Jean-Paul Beaubier, the squad's advisor and former advisor, respectively, are both homosexual.

Marvel Comics mutants
Fictional organizations in Marvel Comics
X-Men
X-Men supporting characters